Americans for Safe Access (ASA), based in Washington, D.C., is a member-based organization working to ensure safe and legal access to cannabis for therapeutic uses and research. Americans for Safe Access works in partnership with local, state, and federal legislators in the United States to create policies that improve access to medical cannabis for both patients and researchers. ASA has over 100,000 active members across the United States.

Media and activism
ASA provides legal training for and medical information to patients, attorneys, health and medical professionals, and policymakers throughout the United States. They also organize media support for court cases, rapid response to law enforcement raids, and capacity building for advocates.

Founding
Medical cannabis patient and Executive Director Steph Sherer founded ASA in 2002 in response to federal raids on patients and providers in California. Since then, their lobbying, media, and legal campaigns have led to court precedents, new sentencing standards, different legislative and administrative policies and procedures, as well as new legislation.

Accomplishments
 Successfully filed suit against California Highway Patrol (CHP), the largest law enforcement agency in the state, compelling CHP to stop confiscating patients’ medical cannabis to comply with the mandates of Proposition 215.
 Worked with elected officials to enact ordinances regulating medical cannabis dispensing collectives (dispensaries). Twenty four cities and seven counties have given dispensaries protection and legitimacy under local law.
 Has made medical cannabis a major story nationwide and has worked to frame a national discourse on medical cannabis issues.
 Provided outreach services to collectives, including legal training, peer counseling, and media spokesperson training.
 Litigated Americans for Safe Access v. Drug Enforcement Administration, a case calling for removal of cannabis from Schedule I of the Controlled Substances Act.

ASA Leadership

Office of the Executive Director 

 Steph Sherer - Founder
 Debbie Churgai - Director

Operations 

 Geoffrey Marshall - Office & Membership Coordinator
 William Dolphin - Publications
 Paul Marini - Technical Director
 Benjamin Morrison - Senior IT Consultant

Program Staff 

 Dustin McDonald - Interim Policy Director
 Don Duncan - California Director
 Reenal Doshi - Director of Outreach and Communications

Patient Focused Certification 

 Heather Despres - PFC Director
 Trish Flaster - Patient Focused Certification Board Chair

Podcast
Americans for Safe Access partners with online publication The Cannigma to co-produce a podcast, The Cannabis Enigma, featuring doctors, patients, researchers, scientists, and legislative updates.

References

External links
 
 ASA Leadership

Drug policy organizations based in the United States
Drug policy reform
Organizations established in 2002
Medical and health organizations based in Washington, D.C.
Cannabis law reform organizations based in the United States
Medicinal use of cannabis organizations based in the United States
Medical associations based in the United States
2002 establishments in Washington, D.C.
2002 in cannabis